James Connor  (22 February 1861 – 29 January 1899) was a Scottish footballer who played for Airdrieonians, Queen's Park, Corinthian and Scotland. He had the distinction of being the goalkeeper who faced the first ever penalty kick in the history of football, awarded in a local cup tie on 6 June 1891 (four days after the rule was introduced by the International Football Association Board).

References

Sources

External links

London Hearts profile

1861 births
1899 deaths
Scottish footballers
Scotland international footballers
Association football goalkeepers
Footballers from Airdrie, North Lanarkshire
Airdrieonians F.C. (1878) players
Corinthian F.C. players
Queen's Park F.C. players
Place of death missing